Yemenia Flight 626 was an Airbus A310-324 twin-engine jet airliner operated by Yemenia that was flying a scheduled international service, from Sana'a in Yemen to Moroni in Comoros, when it crashed on 30 June 2009 at around 1:50 am local time (10:50 pm on 29 June UTC) while on approach to Prince Said Ibrahim International Airport, killing all but one of the 153 passengers and crew on board. The sole survivor, 12-year-old girl Bahia Bakari, was found clinging to wreckage after floating in the ocean for thirteen hours. Bakari was discharged from the hospital on 23 July 2009.

The final report on the incident concluded that the crew's inappropriate flight control inputs led to an aerodynamic stall. The report also noted that the crew did not react to the warnings being issued by the aircraft.

Aircraft
The aircraft was an Airbus A310-324 twin-engine jetliner, registration 7O-ADJ, manufactured in 1990 as serial number 535. It was in service for 19 years and 3 months, and had accumulated 53,587 flight hours on 18,129 flight cycles at the time of the accident.

Owned by the International Lease Finance Corporation (ILFC) the aircraft first entered service with Air Liberté on 30 May 1990. After leases to successive operators it was leased to Yemenia in September 1999, re-registered 7O-ADJ and remained in service with them until the accident.

Dominique Bussereau, the French Minister of Transport, reported that the plane was inspected in 2007 by the French Directorate General for Civil Aviation and found to have a number of faults; since then, however, the aircraft had not returned to France, so it was never again inspected by the same authority.

Flight history
Most of the passengers originated from Paris, where they had boarded Yemenia Flight 749 (an Airbus A330-200). There was a stopover at Marseille Provence Airport in Marseille, France, where additional passengers and crew boarded. After arriving at Sana'a International Airport in Sana'a, Yemen, passengers transferred to an Airbus A310 for Flight 626, which was due to arrive at Prince Said Ibrahim International Airport in Moroni, Comoros, at 2:30 am local time on 30 June.

The flight crew members, all Yemeni, were Captain Khalid Hajeb (44), First Officer Ali Atif (50), and Flight Engineer Ali Salem. Of the cabin crew, three were Yemeni, two were Filipino, two were Moroccan, one was Ethiopian, and one was Indonesian.

Captain Hajeb had been working for Yemenia since 1989 and became an A310 captain in 2005. He had 7,936 flight hours, including 5,314 hours on the Airbus A310. Hajeb had previously flown to Moroni 25 times. First officer Atif had been with the airline since 1980 and he was qualified to fly the Airbus A310 in 2004. Atif had 3,641 flight hours, with 3,076 on the Airbus A310 and had previously flown to Moroni 13 times.

Accident
The crash occurred at night, off the north coast of Grande Comore, Comoros, in the Indian Ocean several minutes from the airport. The aircraft was on approach to the airport, and was to land on runway 02. However, the aircraft continued past the point at which the approach required it to turn and then made a left turn towards the north, going off course. The aircraft then stalled and crashed into the sea. An unnamed United Nations official at the airport said that the control tower had received a notification that the plane was approaching to land before losing contact.

Yemeni officials did not suspect foul play.
This was the third accident for Yemenia; the previous two were runway excursions with no fatalities, although one aircraft was written off.

Search and recovery
According to the Comoran police, the nation possesses no sea rescue capabilities. Two French military aircraft and a vessel began the formal search for Flight 626. They were sent from Réunion and Mayotte. The Comoros consists of three volcanic islands, Grande Comore, the main island; Anjouan; and Moheli. The Comoros archipelago includes Mayotte, which is French territory and not part of the Union of the Comoros. The wreckage was spotted off the coast of the town of Mitsamiouli, including a few bodies and large amounts of floating debris in the ocean.

Survivor found
14-year-old girl Bahia Bakari was rescued after being spotted clinging to a piece of debris among bodies and wreckage. She was picked up during rescue efforts by local fishermen and speedboats sent by authorities on Grande Comore. She had been holding on to wreckage for 13 hours. Bakari had been traveling with her mother, who did not survive. Bakari was released from the hospital in Paris on 23 July 2009.

Continued searches
Five bodies were recovered at the same time that the lone survivor was rescued. Another 22 bodies were recovered from Mafia Island in Tanzania during the second week of July 2009, and transferred to hospitals in Dar es Salaam.

On 5 July 2009, the signals from the aircraft's flight recorders were detected. The French oceanographic vessel Beautemps-Beaupré arrived at the Comoros on 15 July 2009, and by 23 July 2009 had completed a mapping of the ocean floor around the crash area, which helped pinpoint the exact location of the recorders. Due to the great depth of the recorders' current location, the French navy had announced that it would employ underwater robots for the recovery operation, which began in August 2009.

Investigation
The National Civil Aviation and Meteorological Agency (ANACM) of the Comoros was in charge of the investigation. The French Bureau of Enquiry and Analysis for Civil Aviation Safety (BEA) sent an investigative team, accompanied by Airbus specialists, to assist in the investigation of the causes. Yemen also sent a technical team to Moroni, while a committee, headed by the Yemeni Minister of Transport, was formed. The BEA noted that due to corrosion damage on the memory cards, not all of the data from the CVR could be recovered. The preliminary findings of the investigation pointed to pilot error as the cause of the accident, bringing objections from the Comoros and Yemeni authorities. In November 2009, Yemenia announced that they were looking for a third party to investigate the accident, accusing the French of attacking Yemenia "day and night" and of "harassment". Yemenia stated that the investigation was "affecting the reputation of Yemen". In 2011 the BEA criticized the Comorian authorities, saying that they are not releasing the report in a timely enough manner.

On 25 June 2013, the Comoros investigative commission director Bourhane Ahmed Bourhane announced that "the accident was due to inappropriate action by the crew" during "an unstabilised manoeuvre." A group of victims' family members called for a demonstration in Paris on 28 June 2013 to protest the final report. According to the Yemen Post, Yemen suspects that the plane was taken down, despite a lack of any evidence indicating foul play.

The investigation determined that the accident was caused by the inappropriate actions of the crew that led to a stall from which the aircraft did not recover. The approach was unstabilized, triggering various alarms for ground proximity, aircraft configuration and approach to stall. The crew was focused on navigating, were stressed, and did not respond adequately to the different alarms. Contributing to the accident were the windy weather conditions, a lack of training, the lack of a crew briefing before the flight, and a failure to correctly respond to the pull up alarm.

Passengers and crew

There were 142 passengers and 11 crew aboard. Most passengers are believed to have been either Comorian or French nationals. There were also citizens of Canada, Ethiopia, Indonesia, Morocco, Israeli Arabs, the Philippines and Yemen on board the plane. An airport source has claimed that 66 of the passengers held French citizenship, but many of those could be dual French-Comorian citizens. Many may have been residents of Marseille, a French city with a large Comorian population, headed home for a vacation; the week of the accident marks the beginning of summer vacations for French school children. The two other persons on board were said to be Europeans. The three flight crew members were all Yemeni. Of the cabin crew, 3 were Yemeni, 2 were Filipino, 2 were Moroccan, 1 was Ethiopian, and 1 was Indonesian.

Controversy
The French Transport Minister Dominique Bussereau said that France had banned the plane from its territory several years prior, because "we believed it presented a certain number of irregularities in its technical equipment." However, the Yemeni Transport Minister Khaled Ibrahim Alwazir declared the plane was in line with international standards and that "comprehensive inspection" had been undertaken in Yemen with experts from Airbus. The Comoran community in France marched in Paris, in tribute to the victims of Flight 626. They also disrupted Yemenia flights, protesting in French airports against the airline's safety record and preventing passengers from boarding or checking-in. As a result, Yemenia indefinitely canceled all its flights to and from Marseille and all additional flights between Sana'a and Moroni.

Burial and repatriation of bodies
As of Tuesday, 1 December 2009, remains of nine crew members had been retrieved and arrived in Sana'a. The crew members found were Captain Khalid Hajeb, First Officer Ali Atif, the three Yemeni cabin crew members, the two Moroccan cabin crew members, and the Ethiopian cabin crew member. One cabin crew member, Hamdi Wazea, was buried in Sana'a, while the other Yemenis who were found were buried in Aden. The bodies of the Moroccans were sent to Morocco, while the Ethiopian was sent to Addis Ababa. The crew members who had not been found included Yemeni engineer Ali Salem, the two Filipino cabin crew members, and the Indonesian cabin crew members. In the last two days leading to 1 December, 54 bodies were buried in Moroni.

See also
 Aeroperú Flight 603
 Adam Air Flight 574
 Air France Flight 447
 Kenya Airways Flight 507
 List of accidents and incidents involving commercial aircraft
 Northwest Airlines Flight 255

References

External links
News Flight 626 – Yemenia Airways (Archive)
 National Civil Aviation and Meteorological Agency 
Final report on the accident (Archive) 
 Interim report on the accident (Archive) 
 "Accident de l'A310 de Yemenia Airways Commission d'enquête technique." (Archive) 
Bureau of Enquiry and Analysis for Civil Aviation Safety 
 "Flight IY 626 on 30 June 2009." (Archive)
 "Lettre du Directeur du BEA au Président de la Commission d'enquête de l'Union des Comores." (Alternate) (Archive) 
 Accident d'un Airbus A310 de la compagnie Yemenia Airways (Archive) – Directorate General for Civil Aviation 
 "STATEMENT Subject: Initial report on the crashed Yemenia airplane 70-ADJ, flight IY626 to Moroni." Embassy of Yemen in Canada. (Archive)
 

2009 in the Comoros
Accidents and incidents involving the Airbus A310
Aviation accidents and incidents in 2009
Aviation accidents and incidents in the Comoros
June 2009 events in Asia
Airliner accidents and incidents caused by pilot error
June 2009 events in Africa
Yemenia accidents and incidents